Annapolis Transit is a public transportation service of the Annapolis, Maryland Department of Transportation. It provides seven fixed-routes and one free-fare circulator service to provide access between downtown Annapolis and its suburbs. The Maryland Transit Administration complements these routes, providing access to Baltimore via "local bus service" (Route 70 or Washington, D.C.) and/or Eastern Shore via "commuter bus lines" (Routes 922 & 950).

System
The Annapolis Transit system consists of eight color-coded routes that serve Annapolis and the surrounding area.

References

External links
Company website

Bus transportation in Maryland
Annapolis, Maryland